Keisha Scarville (born 1975) is an American photographer, living in Brooklyn, New York.

Early life
Scarville was born in Kings, New York to Guyanese parents who had emigrated to New York in the 1960s.
She holds a Bachelor of Science degree in photography from the Rochester Institute of Technology.

Work
In the series Mama's Clothes, Scarville creates portraits using her dead mother's clothing, exploring "landscapes and her body to investigate questions of belonging and the impact it has had on her identity." Portraits of her father make up her series Passport (2012–16), black and white passport sized photographs "adorned and reconfigured in myriad ways."

Collections
Scarville's work is held in the following permanent collections:
Smithsonian American Art Museum
Florida State University Museum of Art
Light Work Collection

References

External links

1975 births
21st-century American women photographers
21st-century American photographers
American photographers
Living people
Rochester Institute of Technology alumni
American people of Guyanese descent